40 oz. to Fresno is the sixth studio album by American rock band Joyce Manor, released on June 10, 2022, by Epitaph Records. For the album, the band reunited with veteran producer Rob Schnapf, who last worked with the band on 2016's Cody.

Background
Joyce Manor first formed in 2008 in Torrance, California. In their early years, the band built a following though online word-of-mouth and unhinged live performances. Early albums like Never Hungover Again and their self-titled debut solidified their standing in the fourth-wave emo scene. By the late 2010s, the band had remained on the road constantly, playing to audiences worldwide while shuffling through a rotating cast of drummers. Their latest, Pat Ware, left the group in 2019 to focus on law school. At that moment, vocalist/guitarist Barry Johnson confided in his bandmates that he needed a break, and all agreed to take time off. In the interim, the group compiled a rarities collection, Songs from Northern Torrance, and issued a remixed iteration of their debut. 40 oz. to Fresno originated during the coronavirus pandemic, with the members of Joyce Manor confined to their homes. Johnson was compiling tracks for Torrance when he came upon the unreleased song "Secret Sisters". The song had been recorded for Hungover, but left off the album. Johnson felt it might be exciting to record an album that sounded like it.

40 oz. was partially recorded in July 2020 and January 2021. Johnson confided with Epitaph head Brett Guerwitz on potential session drummers to record with, including Josh Freese. Gurewitz suggested Tony Thaxton, of 2000s emo stalwarts Motion City Soundtrack. Thaxton recorded his portions at Sunset Sound in Los Angeles, and the group were pleased with his contributions: "[He] is unreal at drums and wrote such cool parts," Johnson said. 40 oz. was the band's second album recorded with producer/engineer Rob Schnapf, who also helmed the boards behind the group's 2016 effort Cody. Johnson had grown to like that particular outing with time, and wondered if the band's most recent work could have benefited from Schnapf's input. In a statement, Johnson summarized the album's themes: "This album makes me think of our early tours, drinking a 40 in the van on a night drive blasting Guided by Voices and smoking cigarettes the whole way to Fresno."

The title is a reference to fellow Californian punkers Sublime, and their album 40 oz. to Freedom. Johnson had been re-listening to the group and texted a friend about the album, but his phone auto-corrected the message to Fresno, a city in California. Johnson had initially aimed to title Hungover Again, an allusion their 2014 breakthrough, but receded it shortly before the album was manufactured.

Critical reception

Lindsay Zoladz at The New York Times called it a "relentlessly tuneful 17-minute collection of all-killer, no-filler power-pop." Mia Hughes at Pitchfork considered it "less consciously ambitious than their previous two albums," though still a "refinement of their sound and feel." Timothy Monger, writing for AllMusic, concurred with that sentiment, commenting, "If 40 oz. to Fresno isn't the most ambitious entry in Joyce Manor's discography, it is at least one of their most enjoyable [...] it plays like a satisfying amalgam of their own tics and tendencies, self-contained in a concise 17-minute package." Chris DeVille of Stereogum reviewed it glowingly, summarizing it as "relentlessly catchy, holding power and finesse expertly in balance."

Track listing

Personnel

Joyce Manor
 Barry Johnson – guitar, vocals
 Chase Knobbe – guitar
 Matt Ebert – bass guitar

Additional musicians
 Tony Thaxton – drums
 Kurt Walcher – drums on "Secret Sisters"

Artwork
David Parrot — illustrations
Sabrina Mellado — poster
Allie Hanlon — cover photo
Irma Carol Wilde — illustration
Jason Link — layout

Production
Rob Schnapf – production, recording engineer
Matt Schuessler — production, engineering
Joe Reinhart — production, engineering, mixing on "Secret Sisters"
Kyle Pulley — production, engineering, mixing on "Secret Sisters"
Dave Cooley - mastering engineer

References

External links
 

2022 albums
Epitaph Records albums
Joyce Manor albums